Berna Eli "Barney" Oldfield (January 29, 1878 – October 4, 1946) was an American pioneer automobile racer; his "name was synonymous with speed in the first two decades of the 20th century".

After success in bicycle racing, he began auto racing in 1902 and continued until his retirement in 1918. He was the first man to drive a car at 60 miles per hour (96 km/h) on a circular track.

Biography

Early life
Berna Eli Oldfield was born in York Township, Fulton County, Ohio, near Wauseon and Toledo, on January 29, 1878, to Henry Clay Oldfield, a laborer, and his wife Sarah. He was named after his father's bunkmate in the 68th Ohio Volunteer Infantry during the American Civil War. He had a sister Bertha.

As of the 1880 United States Census, the Oldfields lived in Wauseon. In 1889 they moved to Toledo, where the father Henry got a job at the state mental asylum. In the summer of 1891, Berna worked as a waterboy in order to purchase his first bicycle. According to legend, he spent most of his Sunday afternoons at the local Toledo fire station, hoping for the next call. As the company's “mascot”, he was allowed to ride the big red hose wagon, pulled by a pair of horses that raced through the streets. The following year, Berna worked after school selling the Toledo Blade and Toledo Bee newspapers.

Oldfield dropped out of school after the eighth grade in 1892. He started working with his father as a kitchen helper at the mental asylum during the day and a bellhop at the downtown hotel at night. He eventually worked at the hotel full-time, as he preferred it to working around mental patients. Purportedly the bell captain said that "Berna” was a sissy name, so he changed it to “Barney”. Oldfield was described as having a "magnetic personality", and received many tips at the hotel. He used them to buy his first bike, an "Advance Traveller" with pneumatic tires.

Bicycle racer
Clarence Brigham, who sold the “Cleveland” brand bike, and Edward G. Eager (of Eager & Green Mercantile) who sold the “Columbia” models in his store, organized the Wauseon Cycle Club in their town. They wanted both to increase bicycle sales and draw more people to the town via the Michigan Lake Shore Railroad. Other cycling groups in Swanton, Clyde, Monroe, Adrian, Blissfield, and Toledo were part of the same cycle racing circuit.

Bicyclists raced in half-mile and mile classes on public racetracks usually reserved for horse racing. Other members of the Club included Fred Ballmeyer, Ora Brailey, Curt and Buff Harrison, Doc Myers, Emil Winzeler, Doc Miley, Frank Harper, Dan Raymond (who fixed everyone's bikes), Sid Black (a trick cyclist from Cleveland who later became president of the Packard Motor Company), and Barney Oldfield. In October 1892, the second “Silver Tournament” was held in Wauseon.

In 1893, Oldfield began working as an elevator operator at a different hotel. Every night he stored one hotel tenant's lightweight "Cleveland" cycle in the basement; he sometimes "borrowed it", riding it at night.

At age 16, Oldfield began serious bicycle racing in 1894 after officials from the "Dauntless" bicycle factory asked him to ride for the Ohio state championship. Although he came in second, the race was a turning point. Oldfield was hired as a parts sales representative for the Stearns bicycle factory. There he met Beatrice Lovetta Oatis, his future wife; they married in 1896.

By 1896, Oldfield was paid by Stearns, based in Syracuse, New York, to race on its amateur team.

Auto racer

Oldfield was loaned a gasoline-powered bicycle to race at Salt Lake City. Through fellow racer Tom Cooper, he met entrepreneur Henry Ford, who was at the beginning of his career as an auto manufacturer in Michigan. Ford had prepared two automobiles for racing, and he asked Oldfield if he would like to test one in Michigan. Oldfield agreed and traveled to Michigan for the trial, but neither car started. Although Oldfield had never driven an automobile, he and Cooper bought both test vehicles when Ford offered to sell them for $800. One was "No. 999", which was debuted in October 1902 at the Manufacturer's Challenge Cup. Today it is displayed at the Henry Ford Museum in Greenfield Village, Michigan.

Oldfield agreed to drive against the current champion, Alexander Winton. Oldfield was rumored to have learned how to operate the controls of the "999" only the morning of the event. Oldfield won by a half mile in the five-mile (8 km) race. He slid through the corners like a motorcycle racer rather than braking. It was a great victory for Ford and resulted in both Oldfield and Ford becoming nationally known.

John Wilkinson, who designed an air-cooled engine for Franklin Automobile Company and was their chief engineer, raced against Oldfield in 1902. He won the state  championship in the record time of 6:54:06.

Two months later, he drove one mile in 55.8 seconds at the Empire City Race Track in Yonkers, New York.

Alexander Winton hired Oldfield as a professional driver and agreed to supply him with free cars for racing. Oldfield, his manager Ernest Moross, and agent Will Pickens traveled throughout the United States in a series of timed runs and match races, and he earned a reputation as a showman. Oldfield was "the first American to become a celebrity solely for his ability to drive a car with great skill, speed, and daring." He liked to increase the drama in best of three matches: he would win the first part by a nose, lose the second, and win the third. Oldfield won first place at the Indianapolis Motor Speedway on August 21, 1909 in a Mercedes Benz.

He bought a Benz, and raised his speed in 1910 to  while driving his "Blitzen Benz". At Daytona Beach, Florida, on March 16, 1910, in his Blitzen Benz, he set the world speed record, driving 131.724 mph, for which he earned the nickname “speed king”.

Suspension and later career

Oldfield was suspended by the American Automobile Association (AAA) for his "outlaw" racing, and was unable to race at sanctioned events for much of his career. He made his career by being paid to set speed records, and conducting match races and exhibitions.

In 1914, his agent Will Pickens staged a "Championship of the Universe", pitting Oldfield against another of his clients, aviator Lincoln Beachey. Oldfield raced his Fiat car against Beachey's biplanes in at least 35 matches, barnstorming the country. In the more remote areas, they raced at county fair horse tracks. The Championship was "extremely successful", and both Oldfield and Beachey earned more than $250,000 in their barnstorming.

After being reinstated by the AAA, Oldfield competed in the 1914 and 1916 Indianapolis 500, finishing fifth in each attempt. He was the first person to run a 100-mile-per-hour lap. His 1914 Indy finish was in an Indianapolis-built Stutz, and he was the highest-finishing driver in an American car in a race that was dominated by European brands.

Oldfield used the same car in his victory at the Los Angeles to Phoenix off-road race in November 1914. Oldfield also finished second in two major road races that year, the Vanderbilt Cup and the Corona 300. In 1915 he won the Venice, California 300 road race.

In November 1914 he won the Los Angeles-to-Phoenix Cactus Derby Race; the victor's medal proclaimed him “Master Driver of the World”. On May 28, 1916, he became the first person to lap the Indianapolis Speedway at more than 100 mph in the front-wheel-drive "Christie Racer", designed by John Walter Christie. He used the Blitzen Benz to break the existing mile, two-mile, and kilometer records at the Daytona Beach Road Course at Ormond, Florida. Afterward, he charged $4,000 for each of his appearances at driving races.

In June 1917 Oldfield used his Golden Submarine, designed with a roll bar to protect the driver, to beat fellow racing legend Ralph DePalma in a series of 10- to  match races at Milwaukee.

He retired from racing in 1918, but continued to tour and make movies. In what was his last attempt at racing, in 1932 he tried to re-enter speed racing with a new car design, but was unable to find any financial sponsors.

Oldfield died on October 4, 1946, of a heart attack. He had married a total of four times. He was survived by Bessie Gooby Oldfield, whom he had divorced in 1924 and remarried in 1945, making her both his second and fourth wife. When they were first married, they adopted a daughter, Betty (who by his death was married to a Kelly). He was buried in the Holy Cross Cemetery in Culver City, California.

Beyond racing

Performances
Oldfield starred as himself for ten weeks in the Broadway musical The Vanderbilt Cup (1906).

He also appeared in movies, including the silent film Barney Oldfield's Race for a Life (1913), where he raced against a train to rescue a heroine tied to the train tracks. He was also featured in The First Auto (1927) as an early pioneer of the automotive history. He was a technical advisor for the Vanderbilt Cup sequence in the feature film Back Street (1941). He starred as himself in a racing film titled Blonde Comet, the story of a young woman trying to achieve success as a racecar driver.

Racing safety
Bob Burman, one of Oldfield's rivals and closest friends, was killed in a wreck during a race in Corona, California. Oldfield and Harry Arminius Miller, who developed and built carburetors and was one of the most famous engine builders, worked after that to design a racecar that was not only fast and durable, but would protect the driver in the event of an accident.  They built a racecar with a roll cage inside a streamlined driver's compartment, which completely enclosed the driver, calling it the "Golden Submarine".

Business ventures

Oldfield helped fellow racer Carl G. Fisher found the Fisher Automobile Company in Indianapolis. This is widely considered the first automobile dealership in the United States.

He also developed what was called the Oldfield tire for Firestone. In its slogan, Firestone touted that Oldfield had said, "Firestone Tires are my only life insurance". In 1924, the Kimball Truck Co. of Los Angeles built the only 1924 Oldfield.

Awards and recognition
The Oakshade Raceway in Wauseon, Ohio, Oldfield's birthplace, holds an annual race named for him.  
 In 1946 he was inducted into the Automotive Hall of Fame.
 In 1953, Oldfield was one of the first ten pioneers of auto racing enshrined in Auto Racing's Hall of Fame, located in Detroit.
 In 1989 he was inducted into the inaugural class of the Motorsports Hall of Fame of America as the at-large representative.
 In 1990, he was inducted into the International Motorsports Hall of Fame.
 In 1990 Oldfield was named to the National Sprint Car Hall of Fame.

In popular culture
Barney Oldfield appears as the Master Driver in the 1927 silent movie The First Auto, directed by Roy Del Ruth. (See above for other performances in film and stage related to his racing career.)
In the TV series I Love Lucy episode "Lucy Learns to Drive" (Season 4): Ethel remarks "Oh, pardon me, Barney Oldfield."
In the TV series "Dennis The Menace" episode "The Soapbox Derby," Mrs. Wilson tells Mr. Wilson, "You're a regular Barney Oldfield"
In the TV series “The Partridge Family,” (Season 1, Episode 3) “Who do you think that you are, Barney Oldfield?”  
Apollo 16 astronaut Charles Duke remarked about Oldfield in reference to astronaut John Young's driving of the lunar rover on the Moon in 1972. "Indy has never seen a driver like this-Barney Oldfield," quipped Duke.

Indy 500 results

References

Further reading
William F. Nolan, Barney Oldfield: The Life And Times Of America's Legendary Speed King; 
International Motorsports Hall of Fame Biography
"Barney Oldfield Biography"
Beachey's aircraft vs. Oldfield's car

External links

Barney Oldfield & Ford - History & Photos

Barney Oldfield Speedway at Great America theme parks
 

1878 births
1946 deaths
Champ Car champions
People from Fulton County, Ohio
Racing drivers from Ohio
Indianapolis 500 drivers
Burials at Holy Cross Cemetery, Culver City
International Motorsports Hall of Fame inductees
National Sprint Car Hall of Fame inductees
AAA Championship Car drivers
Catholics from Ohio